Kevin Leander Belcher (November 9, 1961 – April 12, 1997) was an American football offensive tackle who played two seasons in the National Football League (NFL) with the Los Angeles Raiders and Denver Broncos. He was drafted by the Raiders in the seventh round of the 1985 NFL Draft. He played college football at the University of Wisconsin–Madison and attended Bassick High School in Bridgeport, Connecticut.

Professional career
Belcher was selected by the Los Angeles Raiders with the 186th pick in the 1985 NFL Draft and played in four games for the team during the 1985 season. He also spent time on injured reserve during the season. He was released by the Raiders in August 1986.

Belcher played in one game, a start, for the Denver Broncos in 1987.

Personal life
Belcher died at his home in Howard, Wisconsin on April 12, 1997.

References

External links
Just Sports Stats

1961 births
1997 deaths
Players of American football from Connecticut
American football offensive tackles
Wisconsin Badgers football players
Los Angeles Raiders players
Denver Broncos players
Sportspeople from Bridgeport, Connecticut
People from Howard, Wisconsin